The Merchant Taylors' Hall in York, England, is a medieval guildhall near the city wall in the Aldwark area of the city.

History 

The hall was built by the Fraternity of St John the Baptist (an organisation connected to the Taylors' Guild) in c.1415.

It received a new cladding in the seventeenth century. The adjoining Counsel House (sometimes called the Counting House) contains two stained glass windows by York glass painter Henry Gyles. The south window shows Queen Anne, and was made to commemorate her accession to the throne while the side window depicts the coat of arms of the London Company of Merchant Taylors.

In the eighteenth century, the building was used for banquets and entertainment, including rope dancing, tumbling and a pantomime called "The Force of Magick or The Birth of Harlequin".

The building is still used by the Guild of Merchant Taylors of York, and is available to hire. It is a short walk from this Hall to the Merchant Adventurers' Hall, the hall (originally) of the Mercers' Guild in York.

References

External links

The Company of Merchant Taylors

Grade I listed buildings in York
Grade I listed livery halls
Guildhalls in the United Kingdom
Timber framed buildings in Yorkshire